Eket is a locality situated in Örkelljunga Municipality, Skåne County, Sweden with 409 inhabitants in 2010.

Sports
The following sports clubs are located in Eket:

 Ekets GoIF

References 

Populated places in Örkelljunga Municipality
Populated places in Skåne County